This is a list of American films that were released in 2022.

The 2022 release schedule includes numerous notable films that were originally scheduled for release in 2020 and 2021, but were postponed due to the COVID-19 pandemic.

Box office 
The highest-grossing American films released in 2022, by domestic box office gross revenue, are as follows:

January–March

April–June

July–September

October–December

References

External links
 

Hollywood
2022
American